Calymniodes is a genus of moths of the family Noctuidae. The genus was erected by Paul Dognin in 1907.

Species
Calymniodes acamas (Herrich-Schäffer, [1869]) Venezuela
Calymniodes conchylis (Guenée, 1852) Brazil
Calymniodes pyrostrota Dognin, 1907 Peru
Calymniodes turcica H. Druce, 1908 Peru

References

Acronictinae